The Royal Small Arms Factory ADEN cannon (ADEN being an acronym for "Armament Development, Enfield") is a 30 mm revolver cannon used on many military aircraft, particularly those of the British Royal Air Force and Fleet Air Arm. Developed post-World War II primarily to meet British Air Ministry's requirement for increased lethality in aircraft armament, the cannon was fired electrically and is fully automatic once it is loaded.

Design and development 

During World War II, the German firm Mauser began development of a radically new 20 mm autocannon using a motorised firing mechanism in order to improve the rate of fire. The weapon got the preliminary designation Mauser MG 213 and by the late-war period the design was beginning to mature. However the presence of large heavy bombers like the Boeing B-17 Flying Fortress and Avro Lancaster led to the need of up-arming Luftwaffe fighter aircraft with heavier cannons. Mauser responded to this by adapting the MaschinenGewehr 213 to fire the 30 mm rounds from the MK 108 cannon. This variant got the preliminary designation Maschinenkanone 213, as the 30 mm caliber meant that the weapon was classed as a cannon in German nomenclature. However, as they were adapted with mine shells, which could effectively knock out any aircraft at the time with just a few hits, they did not need high velocity to be effective against non-manoeuvering targets like bombers. Despite frantic efforts, production of the MK 213 never commenced due to development problems such as excessive barrel wear, not to mention the Allied Combined Bomber Offensive campaign against German industry. At the end of the war only 5 prototypes (V1 to V5) of either 20 mm MG 213 or 30 mm MK 213 were finished.

In the post-war era, the MK 213 became well known in armament circles, and a number of companies took up development. This included the Armament Development Establishment in the UK and GIAT in France. A common 30×111mm round was developed that offered a dramatic improvement in muzzle velocity from the MK 108's 540 m/s to the new design's . This was only slightly lower than contemporary 20 mm cannon like the Hispano Mk. V's , making the new round suitable for use during dogfights as well as against larger targets. The mechanism improved the rate of fire from the Mk. V's 750 rpm to 1,300 rpm, a significant improvement. The new weapon was quickly developed and production was set up at the Royal Small Arms Factory in Enfield. The name ADEN was created by combining the two first initials of Armament Development Establishment with the first two letters of Enfield, producing ADEN. 

The ADEN cannon entered service on the British Hawker Hunter in 1954, and was subsequently used on every British gun-armed aircraft until the advent of the Panavia Tornado in the 1980s. The last version to see production was the Mk. 4. An improved version, the Mk. 5, incorporates a multitude of small changes to improve reliability and increase rate of fire to 1,500–1,700 rounds per minute. No new Mk 5s were built, but many older weapons were converted, being redesignated "Mk 5 Straden".

GIAT also introduced their version of the design as the DEFA cannon; the two weapons are very similar.

ADEN 25 
The lighter ammunition was also to produce a higher rate of fire, 1,650 to 1,850 rounds per minute. 
The ADEN 25 was selected for British Harrier GR.5 aircraft. After initial weight issues and persistent problems integrating the cannon with the pod, and the pod with the Harrier GR.5 aircraft, the MoD considered the cost of fixing the problems excessive. and the project cancelled in 1999. As a result, RAF Harrier GR.7 and GR.9 aircraft did not carry a cannon, no attempt apparently having been made to retrofit the older ADEN 30 mm pods. Fleet Air Arm BAE Sea Harriers retained the 30 mm weapon until their retirement in 2006.

Aircraft use

Built-in armament 

 CAC Sabre
 English Electric Lightning
 Folland Gnat
 Gloster Javelin
 HAL Ajeet
 Hawker Hunter
 Saab Draken
 Saab Lansen
 SEPECAT Jaguar
 ST Aerospace A-4S Skyhawk
 Supermarine Scimitar
 Supermarine Swift

As external armament 

The ADEN gun has seen use in several gun pods including:
British Hawker Siddeley Harrier and BAe Sea Harrier, as well as the US Marine Corps AV-8A/Cs, carried two 30 mm ADEN gun pods below the fuselage of the aircraft.
The  and Matra SA-10 gunpods produced for Swedish Air Force by collaboration with FFV and S. A. Engins Matra used on Saab AJ 37 and Saab Sk 60B/C attack aircraft during the early 1970s used guns taken from scrapped Swedish Saab J 32Bs and Hawker Hunter J 34s. The FFV pod has also been sold to the Austrian Air Force for use on their Saab 105Ös.
A centreline gun pod containing ADEN gun and 100 rounds on the BAE Systems Hawk in RAF service. It is still in active service with, among others, the South African Air Force.

Specifications
The Aden is belt feed using a disintegrating belt of open type links.

Type: Single-barrel aircraft autocannon
Action: Revolver drum with 5 chambers
Operation: Gas operation
Cocking-system: Pneumatic
Priming: Electronic firing
Firing-system: Electrical 26 volts DC 
Rifling: Progressive RH parabolic twist, 16 grooves 
Cartridge: 30 × 111 mm
Calibre: 
Weight of complete weapon: ,  with 200 rounds
Length of complete weapon: 
Weight of barrel: 
Length of barrel: 
Recoil load: 31.4 kN
Rate of fire: 1,200–1,500 rpm (ADEN Mk. 4), 1,500–1,700 rpm (ADEN Mk.5)

Ammunition

Ammunition for the ADEN included.High Explosive (High Explosive Mk.3Z )
Projectile type: "High-Explosive, High-Capacity"
Fuze type: Nose fuze
Explosive filling:  Torpex 5 (Hexotonal)
Cartridge weight: 
Projectile weight: 
Propellant weight: 
CU-pressure: 2930 bar
Muzzle velocity:   

Armour-piercing (30 mm pprj m/55 Sweden)
Projectile type: Armour-Piercing, Composite Rigid
Fuze type: None
Core type: Tungsten penetrator
Cartridge weight: 
Projectile weight: 
Core weight: 
Propellant weight: 
CU-pressure: 2930 bar
Muzzle velocity: 

Target practice (Practice Mk.2Z, UK )
Projectile type: Inert solid metal plug in place of fuze and explosive charge
Cartridge weight: 
Projectile weight: 
Core weight: 
Propellant weight: 
CU-pressure: 2930 bar
Muzzle velocity: 

 Users 

Royal Australian Air Force

Royal Bahraini Air Force

Belgian Air Component

Chilean Air Force

Danish Air Force

Finnish Air Force

Iraqi Air Force

Indian Air Force
Indian Naval Air Arm

Indonesian Air Force (TNI-AU)

Royal Jordanian Air Force

Kenyan Air Force

Kuwait Air Force

Lebanese Air Force

Royal Netherlands Air Force

Royal Malaysian Air Force

Royal Air Force of Oman

Peruvian Air Force

Qatar Emiri Air Force
 (now )
Royal Rhodesian Air Force (later to Air Force of Zimbabwe)

Royal Saudi Air Force

Republic of Singapore Air Force

South African Air Force

Republic of Korea Air Force

Somali Air Corps

Spanish Naval Air Arm

Swedish Air Force – designated 30 mm akan m/55''

Swiss Air Force

Royal Thai Navy Flying Unit

United Arab Emirates Air Force

Fleet Air Arm
Royal Air Force

Notes

See also 
DEFA cannon – comparable French design
Mauser BK-27 – comparable German design
M39 cannon – comparable US design
VENOM LR 30 mm – 21st century derivative, designed to fire from RCWS

References

External links 
Mauser and Aden Cannon (RAF source)

30 mm artillery
Aircraft guns
Autocannon
Military equipment introduced in the 1950s